Nicos Nicolaides, Nikos Nikolaides or Nikos Nikolaidis may refer to:

 Nicos Nicolaides (1884–1956), Greek painter and writer from Cyprus
 Nicos Nicolaides (politician) (born 1953), Greek Cypriot politician
 Nikos Nikolaidis (1939–2007), Greek film director and writer